
The Armada were a three-piece rock band based in Cork, Ireland fronted by Jeff Martin, formerly of The Tea Party. The band was formed when Jeff Martin and Wayne Sheehy met in an Irish Pub. The two hit it off immediately and soon started making music together.

The name of the band refers to the Spanish Armada: "We were like, what is this?" [Jeff Martin] said. "It's massive, but what do we make of this?"
That's when Sheehy commented, "It's kind of like the Spanish Armada . . . attacking you from all fronts."

On 27 September 2008, Gareth Forsyth was announced as the band's touring bassist/keyboardist through the band's MySpace. Their debut album, The Armada, was released through the Kingdom Records website on 4 November 2008.

By 2009, after Sheehy moved to Perth to join Martin and prepare for a tour, Jay Cortez was the band's bass player, playing his first show in the band on 1 July 2009. Sheehy announced on Facebook in September 2010 that he left the band after its first tour, but stayed involved due to the release of the Live at Womadelaide 2010 DVD. In 2010 Martin formed Jeff Martin 777, with Cortez and Malcolm Clark on drums, and The Armada effectively ended.

Members
Jeff Martin - vocals, guitar
Wayne Sheehy - drums
Jay Cortez - bass

Discography
 The Armada (2008)
 Live at Womadelaide 2010 (2010)

References

External links
Official website
The Armada MySpace
Jeff Martin Official Website
Kingdom Records

Irish rock music groups
Musical groups from Cork (city)